Divided Loyalties is a Canadian historical drama television film, directed by Mario Azzopardi and broadcast by CTV in 1990. The film stars Jack Langedijk as Mohawk leader Joseph Brant, portraying his "divided loyalties" between British and American allies during the American Revolutionary War, and Tantoo Cardinal as his sister Molly Brant.

The cast also includes Denis Lacroix, Chris Wiggins, Robert Bidaman, John Bourgeois, Jon Granik, Yvan Labelle, Dale Wilson, Lisa LaCroix, Raoul Trujillo, August Schellenberg, Neil Dainard, George Touliatos, Kennetch Charlette, Richard Maracle, Vern Harper and Troy Martin.

The film faced some criticism for casting the non-indigenous Langedijk in the lead, with Cardinal admitting that she had reservations about appearing in the film on that basis, but stating that she decided to accept the role after carefully examining the script and concluding that it represented a sincere effort to respectfully depict the First Nations experience. Azzopardi, however, disowned the film after Baton Broadcasting deemed its original edit not broadcast-worthy, and re-edited it in advance of the broadcast.

The film was broadcast by CTV on February 13, 1990.

Awards and nominations

References

External links

1990 films
1990 television films
English-language Canadian films
Films based on Canadian novels
Canadian historical drama films
Canadian drama television films
First Nations films
1990s Canadian films
Films directed by Mario Philip Azzopardi